is a compilation of remastered ports of Metal Gear video games released for PlayStation 3 and Xbox 360 in 2011 and PlayStation Vita in 2012. The compilation contains Metal Gear Solid 2: Sons of Liberty and Metal Gear Solid 3: Snake Eater on all three platforms, plus Metal Gear Solid: Peace Walker on the home console versions (outside Japan), with the individual games all branded as HD Edition. Bluepoint Games handled the conversions of Metal Gear Solid 2 and 3 (with Armature Studio assisting on the PS Vita and the NVIDIA Shield TV versions), while Genki worked on Peace Walker. It is the first game with involvement from Bluepoint Games that is not published by Sony Interactive Entertainment.

Games
The included games are:

Features
The core play mechanics and story for all games remains unchanged with the HD Editions. For the remastering, all three games underwent graphics overhaul to allow them to support modern 720p resolution and 60 frames per second on home consoles, and qHD resolution on PS Vita. The PS3 and PS Vita versions have Trophy support, while the Xbox 360 versions include Achievements.

The controls for each game have been modified to suit the different configurations of each platform. Since the Xbox 360 and PS Vita version lack the pressure-sensitive buttons featured on the PS2 controllers, the ability to aim and lower a firearm without firing it in Metal Gear Solid 2 and 3 are assigned to a specific button instead in those versions (either, by pressing the left stick on the Xbox 360 controller or by pressing the d-pad down on the PS Vita). The PS Vita versions in particular makes use of the touch screen and touch pad for various functions such as item/weapon selection, zooming in or out with the binoculars or peeking out of walls during corner view. The console versions of Peace Walker feature dual analog controls, allowing players to control the camera or their aim with the right stick.

Most of the additional features and content that were present in the Substance and Subsistence editions of the games have been ported to the HD Editions as well. These include the VR/Alternative Missions, Snake Tales and Casting Theater modes for Metal Gear Solid 2, plus the third-person camera view and Demo Theater for Metal Gear Solid 3. The original Metal Gear and Metal Gear 2: Solid Snake as they appeared in the Subsistence edition are also included, accessible from the main menu in Metal Gear Solid 3.

The PS3 and Vita versions of Metal Gear Solid 2 and 3 have a "Transfarring" feature, which allows users to transfer their save file between both platforms via a Wi-Fi connection or through a cloud storage, allowing continuous play of the same save file on a different platform. The PS3 version of Peace Walker has a similar connectivity with the PSP version of the game, allowing the transferring of save files through a USB connection.

Releases

Regional differences
The Japanese release of the compilation, titled Metal Gear Solid HD Edition, only includes Metal Gear Solid 2 and Metal Gear Solid 3, even on the home console versions. Metal Gear Solid: Peace Walker - HD Edition was instead given a stand-alone physical release on PS3 and Xbox 360 in Japan. To compensate for the separate releases, the first print run of the Japanese PS3 version of the compilation included a voucher code to download the original Metal Gear Solid from the Japanese PlayStation Store, while the first print run of Peace Walker - HD Edition came with a download code for the  PlayStation Portable version of Peace Walker. The Japanese Xbox 360 versions of both, the compilation and Peace Walker, instead offered voucher codes for Metal Gear-themed items for Xbox Live Avatars. Both Metal Gear Solid 2 and Metal Gear Solid 3 feature Japanese voice acting for the Japanese HD Editions, despite Metal Gear Solid 2 being based on the Substance edition, which originally used English voices.

Limited editions

On August 15, 2011, UK retailer Zavvi secured the exclusive right to sell the Metal Gear Solid: Ultimate HD Collection, exclusively available for the PS3, which was set to see only 4,000 copies manufactured worldwide and would be released on November 25. It would include the HD Collection, and the Ultimate version would add to the package with the PS3 game Metal Gear Solid 4: Guns of the Patriots, a download code for Metal Gear Solid and five exclusive art cards. The contents would come in a single steel book packaging. However, on November 25, it disappeared from Zavvi without explanation. On November 30, Zavvi changed the name from Ultimate HD Collection to Ultimate HD Edition, and announced that its altered the contents of its advertised Metal Gear Solid: HD Ultimate Edition set. Zavvi sent out an email to all customers holding an order for the edition, explaining that Konami has "advised of a change to the contents" of the set. The edition would include variant Metal Gear Solid steel book, an exclusive Metal Gear Solid T-shirt and an exclusive 250 page premium art book showcasing the artwork of Yoji Shinkawa. All those who pre-ordered the previous edition before it was cancelled also receive a Platinum copy of Metal Gear Solid 4. Zavvi's site also has a listing for an Xbox 360 version of the revised Ultimate Edition, making it no longer exclusive for the PS3. On December 7, Zavvi renamed the edition to Metal Gear Solid HD Collection Limited Edition, and revealed that 6000 copies of the PS3 version and 4000 copies of the Xbox 360 version are available for pre-order. In total 8000 (PS3) and 5000 (360) units are being made worldwide.

A North American Limited Edition for the HD Collection became available alongside the standard release. The Limited Edition includes specialized packaging created by Yoji Shinkawa, the series' lead artist, and an exclusive, 248-page art book titled The Art of Metal Gear Solid.

A Japanese Premium Package for both the Metal Gear Solid HD Collection and the separate (Japan-only) HD conversion of Peace Walker is also released. The Peace Walker package includes the game, a Play Arts figure of Snake in Battle Dress and an audio CD featuring vocal and unused music tracks. The Limited Edition of Metal Gear Solid HD Edition will include a copy of the game, an illustration from series artist Yoji Shinkawa, a copy of The Art of Metal Gear Solid The Original Trilogy, and an audio CD with vocal tracks from each of the first three games. Paying extra, players receive Metal Gear Solid 2 and Metal Gear Solid 3 mugs, headphones and bags. Paying extra for the Peace Walker package includes a Peace Walker mug and a Kazuhira Miller Play Arts Kai figure.

Digital releases
The HD Edition-branded versions of all three games were later released as digital downloads on the Xbox Live Marketplace and PlayStation Store. The digital versions of Metal Gear Solid 2 and 3 were released on August 21, 2012 as a bundle on the Xbox 360 and individually on PS3 and PS Vita, while Peace Walker was released for the Xbox 360 and PS3 on August 28, 2012. A digital version of the full collection was also released for the PS3. The Xbox 360 version of Peace Walker was added to the Xbox One's backwards compatibility program on March 13, 2018. Metal Gear Solid 2 and 3 were later added to the backwards compatibility program on October 9 of the same year. The PS3 version of the HD Collection was made available on the PlayStation Now streaming service on February 5, 2019. The Xbox 360 version became backwards compatible with the Xbox One on October 8, 2018, joining the Xbox Game Pass subscription service catalog on September 5, 2019. With the release of Xbox Series X/S on November 10, 2020, Metal Gear Solid HD Collection automatically became compatible on the console.

The Legacy Collection

On April 22, 2013, Konami announced a new version of the collection titled Metal Gear Solid: The Legacy Collection, exclusive to PS3. This later collection includes all the games featured on the HD Collection on the first disc, along with Metal Gear Solid 4: Guns of the Patriots on a second disc and voucher codes for the original Metal Gear Solid and Metal Gear Solid: VR Missions. The Legacy Collection was released in North America on  July 9, 2013, and in Japan on July 11, 2013. The European version was released on September 13, 2013.

Reception

Metal Gear Solid HD Collection received critical acclaim upon release. Review aggregator Metacritic gave the Xbox 360 version 90/100, the PlayStation 3 version 89/100 and the PlayStation Vita version 81/100.

In December 2011, the game received the award for "Best HD Remake of 2011" from TeamXbox, with Halo: Combat Evolved Anniversary as the runner-up. In a feature article regarding games collections, 1UP listed Metal Gear Solid HD Collection as "The Closest We've Come to Perfection" owing to the improved quality its games were given.

The compilation's absence of Metal Gear Solid drew scrutiny, particularly as a HD remake of the game existed in the form of 2004's Metal Gear Solid: The Twin Snakes. In response, Kojima Productions' Sean Eyestone stated that The Twin Snakes was not included as neither the developers nor Hideo Kojima were directly involved with the creation of the game and therefore did not consider it canon.

Notes

References

External links
 Official site for HD Editions at Kojima Productions
Metal Gear Solid HD Collection at Konami.com
Metal Gear Solid HD Collection at PlayStation.com

2011 video games
Action-adventure games
Bluepoint Games games
Genki (company) games
Konami video game compilations
Metal Gear video games
PlayStation 3 games
PlayStation Vita games
Single-player video games
Stealth video games
Video game remasters
Video games developed in Japan
Video games developed in the United States
Xbox 360 games